Ethmia dodecea is a moth of the family Depressariidae. It is found in Europe, Asia Minor, Iran, the south-western, southern and eastern European parts of Russia, the Caucasus, Transcaucasia, western Kazakhstan and Siberia.

The moth flies from May to August depending on the location.

The larvae feed on Lithospermum officinale.

References

External links
Lepidoptera of Belgium

dodecea
Moths of Europe
Moths of Asia
Moths described in 1828